Marcelo Demoliner and Rodrigo Guidolin were the defending champions, but Demoliner chose not to participate in doubles. Guidolin partnered up with Fernando Romboli, but they lost in the quarterfinals against Dominik Meffert and Leonardo Tavares.Dominik Meffert and Leonardo Tavares won in the final 3–6, 6–2, [10–2] against Ramón Delgado and André Sá.

Seeds

Draw

Draw

References
 Main Draw

Brazil Open Series - Doubles